Yu Yoshimoto (born November 10, 1982) is a former Japanese professional basketball player who played for the Akita Northern Happinets of the bj league in Japan. He currently teaches amateurs at the Happinets organization. He also plays for the Mitane Taikyo Kotooka of Noshiro Yamamoto Basketball Association.

Career statistics

Regular season 

|-
| align="left" | 2011-12
| align="left" | Akita
| 7|| || 0.9|| .167|| .250|| .000|| 0.0|| 0.1|| 0.0|| 0.0|| 0.4
|-

Playoffs 

|-
|style="text-align:left;"|2011-12
|style="text-align:left;"|Akita
| 1 ||0  || 1.0 || .500 || .500 || .000 || 0.0 || 0.0 || 0.0 || 0.0 || 3.0
|-

References

1982 births
Living people
People from Oga, Akita
Akita Northern Happinets players
Japanese men's basketball players
Sportspeople from Akita Prefecture